Bortel is a surname. Notable people with the surname include:

Milan Bortel (born 1987), Slovak footballer
Walter Bortel (1926–2000), Austrian cyclist

Place
Bortel Lake, Switzerland